Ronald Regis Duterte (January 15, 1934 – November 20, 2005) was a Filipino politician and lawyer who served as the mayor of Cebu City from 1983 to 1986. Prior to becoming mayor, he served as the vice mayor of the said city from 1980 to 1983 and was a member of the City Council for three consecutive terms from 1963 to 1980.

Early life and education 
Duterte was the son of Ramon Gonzales Duterte and Rosario Regis. His father is the brother of Vicente Duterte, former mayor of Danao and governor of Davao, making him a first cousin of former Philippine president Rodrigo Duterte.

He was admitted to the Philippine Bar on March 2, 1956. He later earned a master's degree in comparative law at Columbia Law School of Columbia University and in 1960, a doctor of laws at the Universidad de Madrid.

Political career 
He started his political career as councilor after winning in the 1963 elections under the group of Sergio Osmeña Jr. He went on to be re-elected in 1967 and in 1971, where he placed first among candidates for councilor. As councilor, Duterte authored 44 ordinances. In 1980, he became the fourth elected vice mayor of Cebu City.

Then mayor Florentino Solon had to resign from his position in 1983 after he was appointed by then president Ferdinand Marcos to become Deputy Minister of Health. This led to Duterte's accession into office as mayor with Vicente Kintanar Jr., who was then the city's first-rank councilor, becoming the city's new vice mayor. Duterte was a member of Kilusang Bagong Lipunan.

Post-mayoral career 
After his stint as mayor, Duterte in 1991 became the president of then University of Southern Philippines (USP) and later on as dean of its college of law. As university president, he led the gradual reopening of USP's college operations.

Personal life 
Duterte was married to Gloria Parinas, the 1964 Miss Hawaii Filipina. They had three children namely Kathleen Genevieve, Christian Alison and Ronald Patrick II.

Death 
Duterte died at the age of 71 on November 20, 2005.

References 

|-

1934 births
2005 deaths
Cebuano people
Vice Mayors of Cebu City
Mayors of Cebu City
20th-century Filipino lawyers
Kilusang Bagong Lipunan politicians
Duterte family
Columbia Law School alumni
Complutense University of Madrid alumni
Cebu City Council members